Yun Yong-chol (born 28 February 1968) is a North Korean boxer. He competed in the men's lightweight event at the 1992 Summer Olympics.

References

External links
 

1968 births
Living people
North Korean male boxers
Olympic boxers of North Korea
Boxers at the 1992 Summer Olympics
Place of birth missing (living people)
Lightweight boxers